Deleriyes Joe August Fisher Cramer (born August 23, 1973) is a Canadian actor who had a briefly successful career in Canadian television and Hollywood in the mid-1980s, most notably for his role in the film Flight of the Navigator.

Early life
Cramer was born in Vancouver, British Columbia, Canada on August 23, 1973. He entered professional acting in his early teenage years using the name Joey Cramer.

Filmography
 1984 – Runaway as Bobby Ramsey
 1985 – I-Man as Eric Wilder
 1986 – Flight of the Navigator as David Scott Freeman
 1986 – The Clan of the Cave Bear as young Broud
 1987 – Stone Fox as Willie
 1988 – The Invasion, (Short Film)
 1996 – It's My Party (uncredited)
 2018 – 50/50 Grind as Lenny (short film)
 2020 – Life After the Navigator as himself
 2020 – Fried Barry

Television
Murder, She Wrote – Season 3 episodes 1 and 2 "Death Stalks the Big Top" (1 and 2) (1986) as Charlie McCallum.
The Disney Sunday Movie – "I-Man" (1986) as Eric Wilder.

Awards
Cramer was nominated for a Saturn Award for Best Performance by a Young Actor from the Academy of Science Fiction, Fantasy and Horror Films for his performance in Flight of the Navigator (1987).

Personal life
When his acting career ended in the late 1990s, Cramer returned to Canada's Sunshine Coast, where he worked in a small sporting goods store.

In 2008, he was prosecuted for careless storage of a firearm, and received three months' probation. Later that year, he was convicted for possession of a controlled substance for the purpose of trafficking, and received a prison sentence of six months. In October 2011, he was fined for consuming liquor in a public place.

In 2011, he was convicted of uttering threats and possession of a weapon for a dangerous purpose, and was jailed for 30 days.  Later that year, he was convicted of cashing forged bank cheques.

On May 1, 2016, he was arrested in connection with the robbery of Scotiabank in Sechelt, British Columbia few days earlier. On June 8, 2016, he pleaded guilty to charges of robbing a bank, wearing a disguise to commit a crime, fleeing police, and dangerous driving. On August 31, 2016, he was sentenced to a custodial term of two years less a day, as well as two years of probation, conditions of which included attending counselling and residing in a treatment centre for narcotics abuse.

In 2018, production began on a documentary about Cramer's life, Life After the Navigator. It was released in November 2020 on Blu-ray Disc and select streaming providers.

References

External links

Life After the Navigator – Official movie site

Living people
1973 births
Canadian male film actors
Canadian male child actors
Male actors from Vancouver
People from Gibsons, British Columbia